The Serranía de las Quinchas is an 860 km2 area of tropical rainforest and cloud forest in Colombia. It lies in the  mid Magdalena River Valley in the foothills of the Cordillera Oriental of the Colombian Andes. It is listed as an Important Bird Area, under criteria A1 and A2, as it holds populations of globally threatened and restricted range species. It contains the  El Paujil Nature Reserve, established by the Fundación ProAves in 2004.

Threatened birds found in the Serranía de las Quinchas include the wattled guan, blue-billed curassow, saffron-headed parrot, white-mantled barbet, beautiful woodpecker, Antioquia bristle-tyrant, grey-throated warbler, turquoise dacnis and sooty ant-tanager.  It is also home to the critically endangered brown spider monkey.

References

Further reading 
 BirdLife International (2009) Important Bird Area factsheet: Serrania de las Quinchas, Colombia

Important Bird Areas of Colombia
Mountain ranges of Colombia